Kamilla Składanowska (12 January 1948 – 9 September 2010) was a Polish fencer. She competed at the 1968, 1972, 1976 and 1980 Summer Olympics.

References

1948 births
2010 deaths
Polish female fencers
Olympic fencers of Poland
Fencers at the 1968 Summer Olympics
Fencers at the 1972 Summer Olympics
Fencers at the 1976 Summer Olympics
Fencers at the 1980 Summer Olympics
Fencers from Warsaw
20th-century Polish women
21st-century Polish women